Maurice Gerschon Hindus (February 27, 1891 – July 8, 1969), was a Russian-American writer, foreign correspondent, lecturer and authority on Soviet and Central European affairs.

Background

Maurice Hindus was born into one of four Jewish families in Bolshoye Bykovo, a village then part of the Russian Empire, in modern-day Belarus. His father Jacob Hindus was a kulak; his mother was Sarah Gendeliovitch, and they had eleven children. When his father died, the family was impoverished. In 1905, Hindus, his mother, and his siblings came to America and settled in New York City. He worked as an errand boy while attending night classes, and eventually enrolled at Stuyvesant High School. Yearning to return to a rural setting, Hindus answered an employment agency advertisement for a farm laborer in Upstate New York and, in the Spring of 1908, removed to North Brookfield in Madison County, New York, where he worked at various farms over the next three years. He attended high school in North Brookfield for three years and, thereafter, wishing to pursue a course in agriculture, he applied to Cornell University, but was rejected for a lack of sufficient high school courses.  However, he was accepted at Colgate University, where he earned a degree in literature, with honors, in 1915. After engaging in part-time lecturing on Russia on the Chautauqua circuit in the American Midwest, he furthered his education with a year of graduate study at Harvard University. During the Second World War, he spent three years in the Soviet Union as a war correspondent for the New York Herald Tribune. He also wrote four novels, and travelled to Iran, Iraq, Egypt, and Palestine in 1947. In 1957 he married Frances McClernan. 

On July 8, 1969, Hindus died in New York City at the age of 78, after spending the previous weekend in his beloved North Brookfield.

Russia and writings
Maurice Hindus started as a freelance writer. His first book, The Russian Peasant and the Revolution was published in 1920. He spent several months in 1922 among Russian émigrés, and then wrote several articles about them for Century Magazine, whose editor asked him to go to Russia to study the farm life and system. Several books were written from that experience, including Humanity Uprooted (1929) and Red Bread (1931).  At the time of his writing, Hindus was often criticized by other Soviet experts for not presenting an objective view of Soviet reality and being overly sympathetic or naive about the actual conditions of Soviet life in the 1920s and 30s.

Most of Hindus' writings are about Soviet life and current events. He visited his home country several times, staying three years during World War II. After this time, he wrote Mother Russia (1943), an account of wartime conditions there. During the Cold War Hindus was very critical of the Soviet government, though he always distinguished between the Kremlin and the Russian people. He wrote Crisis in the Kremlin (1953) in response, painting the peasants in a sympathetic light. Hindus helped increase American understanding of the Soviet Union in the 1920s and 1930s and as an ally in World War II.

Books
The Russian Peasant and the Revolution (1920)
Broken Earth  (1926)
Humanity Uprooted (1929)
Red Bread (1931)
The Great Offensive (1933)
Moscow Skies (1936)
Green Worlds: An Informal Chronicle (1938)
We Shall Live Again (1939)
Sons and Fathers (1940)
To Sing with the Angels (1941)
Hitler Cannot Conquer Russia (1941) 
Russia Fights On (1942)
Russia and Japan (1942)
Mother Russia (1943)
The Cossacks - The Story of a Warrior People (1946)
In Search of a Future (1949)
Magda (1951)
Crisis in the Kremlin (1953)
House Without a Roof: Russia After Forty-Three Years of Revolution (1961)
A Traveler in Two Worlds (1971)

References
W. F. Mugleston, "Hindus, Maurice Gerschon (1891–1969)," Dictionary of American Biography, Supplement Eight: 1966-70 (New York, 1988): 260-1.

External links
 
Maurice Hindus Papers Syracuse University Library.

Writers about the Soviet Union
Emigrants from the Russian Empire to the United States
Russian Jews
Belarusian Jews
American people of Belarusian-Jewish descent
People from Slutsk District
1891 births
1969 deaths
Colgate University alumni
Harvard University alumni
American expatriates in the Soviet Union